Laurien Angelista (born June 7, 1987) is a Curaçaoan beauty pageant titleholder who crowned as Miss Curaçao 2014 and represented her country at Miss Universe 2014 pageant.

Early life
Laurien attended Radulphus College in Willemstad, Netherlands Antilles.

Pageantry

Miss Caraïbes Hibiscus 2007
Laurien was crowned Miss Caraïbes Hibiscus 2007 represented Curaçao in Saint Martin (France).

Miss Curaçao 2014
Laurien was crowned Miss Curaçao 2014 at the conclusion of the state pageant held on June 7, 2014. She awarded also as Miss Photogenic at the event. At the same pageant, the first runner-up was Kaydee Chang, the second runner-up was Naomi Scoop and the third runner-up was Chloe Jansen.

Miss Universe 2014
Laurien competed at the Miss Universe 2014 pageant.

References

External links
Official Miss Curaçao Organization website

Living people
Miss Universe 2014 contestants
1987 births